PAP or Pap may refer to:

Places 
 Ancient Pap, an archaeological site in Uzbekistan
 Pap, Hungary, a village in northeastern Hungary
 Pap, Uzbekistan, a town and the administrative center of Pap District
 Pap District, Uzbekistan

People 
 Pap (surname)
 Pap (given name)
 Pap (nickname)

Biology and medicine 
 Nipple or teat
 Pap test or Pap smear, a method for detecting abnormalities in the cells of a woman's cervix
 Phosphatidic acid phosphatase, a key regulatory enzyme in lipid metabolism
 Plasmin-α2-antiplasmin complex, an inactive complex of plasmin and antiplasmin
 Polyadenylate polymerase, an enzyme involved in creation of mRNA tails
 Positive airway pressure, a method of respiratory ventilation used in the treatment of sleep apnea
 Prostatic acid phosphatase, an enzyme produced by the prostate
 Pulmonary alveolar proteinosis, a rare lung disorder

Chemistry
 Phenthoate or PAP, an insecticide poisonous to humans
 Purple acid phosphatases, metalloenzymes that hydrolyse phosphate esters and anhydrides

Organizations 
 Pan-African Parliament, a legislative body of the African Union
 People's Action Party (disambiguation)
 People's Alternative Party, a political party in Malaysia
 People's Armed Police, a paramilitary police force in China
 Polish Press Agency (Polska Agencja Prasowa), a news agency in Poland
 Power to the People (Italy), a coalition of political parties in Italy

Technology 
 Password Authentication Protocol
 Permissible Actions Protocol in cybersecurity
 Policy Administration Point, in the XACML markup language
 Printer Access Protocol, a network protocol for talking to printers in an AppleTalk network
 Push Access Protocol, part of the Wireless Application Protocol suite

Firearms 
 PAP M59, nicknamed Papovka, Yugoslav variants of Soviet SKS semi-automatic military rifles
 Zastava PAP series, Poluautomatska puška (semi-automatic rifle/pistol), Serbian sporting weapons

Other 
 pap, Papiamento or Papiamentu ISO 639-2 and 639-3 language code 
 Pap, a Dutch word for porridge
 Pap, a colloquial term for some types of baby food, particularly those homemade from soft bread
 Pap or mieliepap (Afrikaans for maize porridge), a traditional porridge/polenta and staple food in South Africa
 Pap or Bilz y Pap, a brand name of soft drinks in Chile
 PAP, a code for paper in recycling codes 20, 21, and 22
 PAP, IATA code for Toussaint L'Ouverture International Airport in Port-au-Prince, Haiti
 Perth–Augusta–Perth, a cycling event in Western Australia
 PAP-k, k primes in arithmetic progression in mathematics
 Post-activation potentiation, a physiological response utilized in sports training and especially in Complex training
 Pre-authorized payment, a term sometimes used for Direct debit